Consuelo Castiglioni (born 1959) is a fashion designer.  She is part Chilean and was born and raised in the Italian-Swiss town of Lugano, Switzerland.

Though she has no training in fashion, she founded the fashion label Marni in 1994, and the line has recently risen to prominence. She is married to Gianni Castiglioni, who is Marni's CEO. Their daughter Carolina runs the online store, and is the brand's special projects' director.

In 2009 she worked with Kim Gordon on geometric designs for Marni. The brand now exceeds $100 million sales per year and is worn by celebrities such as Cindy Sherman, Kyra Sedgwick and Gwyneth Paltrow. Castiglioni was ranked in the 2010 “100 most creative people in business”.

In 2013, the brand launched its first, eponymous, fragrance.

References

1959 births
Living people
Italian fashion designers
Italian women fashion designers
Swiss fashion designers
Swiss women fashion designers
People from Lugano